Justice Wright may refer to:

 Archibald Wright (judge) (1809–1884), associate justice of the Tennessee Supreme Court
 Benjamin D. Wright (1799–1874), associate justice of the Florida Supreme Court
 Charles T. Wright (1911–1980), associate justice of the Washington Supreme Court
 Daniel Thew Wright (1864–1943), associate justice of the Supreme Court of the District of Columbia
 Daniel Thew Wright Sr. (1825–1912), member of the Ohio Supreme Court Commission
 Donald Wright (1907–1985), chief justice of the Supreme Court of California
 George G. Wright (1820–1896), associate justice of the Iowa Supreme Court
 J. Craig Wright (1929–2010), associate justice of the Ohio Supreme Court
 John C. Wright (Ohio politician) (1783–1861), associate justice of the Ohio Supreme Court
 John F. Wright (1945–2018), associate justice of the Nebraska Supreme Court
 John Vines Wright (1828–1908), associate justice of the Tennessee Supreme Court
 Jonathan Jasper Wright (1840–1885), associate justice of the South Carolina Supreme Court
 Lance Wright (fl. 2000s), justice of the Court of Arbitration of New South Wales
 Robert Samuel Wright (1839–1904), BCL, justice of the High Court of Justice (Queen's Bench Division)
 Robert Wright (judge, died 1689), chief justice of the King's Bench of England
 Robert Wright (South Carolina judge) (1666–1739), chief justice of South Carolina from 1725
 Samuel T. Wright III (born 1955), associate justice of the Kentucky Supreme Court
 Solomon Wright (fl. 1770s–1790s), associate justice of the Maryland Court of Appeals
 Wilhelmina Wright (born 1964), associate justice of the Minnesota Supreme Court
 William B. Wright (1806–1868), chief judge of the New York Court of Appeals

See also
Judge Wright (disambiguation)